Leptostales ferruminaria, the light-ribboned wave, is a moth of the family Geometridae. The species was first described by Philipp Christoph Zeller in 1872. It is found in North America, where it has been recorded from eastern North America west to Oklahoma and north to British Columbia. The habitat consists of dry shrubby areas and wooded edges along the floodplains of prairie rivers.

The wingspan is 15–20 mm. Adults are variable. The basal area of the forewings is mostly light grey-brown or rusty red, while the median area is darker brick or purple red and the outer third is lighter rusty red. The forewings are crossed by median, postmedian and subterminal lines. All of these are dark and jagged. The hindwings are paler red brown. Adults are on wing from late May to mid-June in one generation per year.

References

Moths described in 1872
Sterrhinae